A Battle of Wits can refer to:

 A Battle of Wits (1912 film), an American silent film
 A Battle of Wits (2006 film), a Hong Kong war film
 "A Battle of Wits", third episode of the 1965 Doctor Who serial The Time Meddler